Servant of the People is an Ukrainian political party.

Servant of the People or Servants of the People may also refer to:

 Servant of the People (TV series), an Ukrainian television program
 Servant of the People 2, an Ukrainian movie based on the TV show of the same name
 Servants of the People Society, an Indian social service organization founded in 1921
 Servants of the People: The Inside Story of New Labour, a 2000 book by Andrew Rawnsley